Brian Kelly (born March 27, 1956) is a former Canadian Football League wide receiver for the Edmonton Eskimos who, in nine years from 1979–1987 caught 575 passes for 11,169 yards and 97 touchdowns. Kelly was a member of 5 Grey Cup Championship teams in Edmonton. Kelly was the number 1 target of Eskimos Quarterback Warren Moon in the early '80's. He was inducted into the Canadian Football Hall of Fame. Kelly was voted one of the CFL's top 50 players (#20) in a poll conducted by Canadian sports network TSN. He graduated from Bishop Amat High School in La Puente, California

References

External links 
 

1956 births
Living people
American players of Canadian football
Canadian Football Hall of Fame inductees
Canadian football wide receivers
Edmonton Elks players
People from Arcadia, California
Players of American football from California
Sportspeople from Los Angeles County, California
Washington State Cougars football players
Canadian Football League Rookie of the Year Award winners